Juan Manuel Mata García (born 28 April 1988) is a Spanish professional footballer who plays as a midfielder for Turkish Süper Lig club Galatasaray. He mostly plays as a central attacking midfielder, but he can also play on the wing. 

A graduate of Real Madrid's youth academy, Mata played for Real Madrid Castilla in 2006–07, before joining Valencia in the summer of 2007. He became an integral part of the club's midfield, making 174 appearances over the course of four seasons. In August 2011, Mata signed for English club Chelsea of the Premier League for a fee believed to be in the region of €28 million, and in his debut season, won the UEFA Champions League and the FA Cup. The following year, Chelsea won the UEFA Europa League, making Mata and teammate Fernando Torres the first players to hold the Champions League, Europa League, World Cup, and the European Championships simultaneously. After falling out of favour at Chelsea under José Mourinho, Mata was sold to Manchester United in January 2014, for a fee of £37.1 million. He made 285 appearances over nine seasons at United, winning the Europa League and FA Cup again as well as the EFL Cup and FA Community Shield. He joined Galatasaray after his contract with United expired in the summer of 2022.

Mata was a Spanish international, having represented Spain at under-16, under-17, under-19, under-20, under-21, Olympic and senior levels. He played for the under-20 side in the 2007 FIFA U-20 World Cup. In June 2009, Mata played at the 2009 FIFA Confederations Cup, his first senior tournament. In September 2009, Mata scored his first goal for the senior team, against Estonia, securing the nation a place at the 2010 FIFA World Cup in South Africa, and was part of Spain's World Cup-winning squad. In 2011, he resumed playing in the under-21 side, helping Spain win the 2011 UEFA European Under-21 Football Championship in Denmark. He won the Golden Player award and was part of the Team of the Tournament. Mata returned to the senior squad for UEFA Euro 2012 and, after coming on as a substitute, scored Spain's fourth goal in the final as Spain defeated Italy 4–0 to retain their title as champions of Europe.

Early life

Mata was born in Burgos, Castile and León. He inherited his name from his father, Juan Manuel Mata Rodríguez, who was also a footballer, playing as a forward for nearby Burgos CF in the 1980s and early 1990s. Mata was raised in his father's home town of Oviedo, Asturias. His father later acted as Mata's agent, becoming FIFA-registered in the process. In his spare time, Mata enjoys table tennis, a sport he played as a child.

Club career

Early career
Mata started his football career at Real Oviedo in 2000, where his father spent part of his career, before joining Real Madrid's youth academy, La Fábrica, in 2003 at the age of 15. After appearing for their Cadete A team, he then swiftly progressed through the junior teams, Juvenil C and finally Juvenil A. In his last campaign (2005–06), he scored two goals in the league and three more in the Copa de Campeones, including the winner in the final against Real Valladolid, adding another three in the Copa del Rey Juvenil.

Switching to Real Madrid Castilla in 2006–07, Mata was given the number 34 shirt in the first team, while wearing number 28 in Castilla. In spite of Castilla's final Segunda División relegation, he finished the season as the side's second best scorer with nine, behind striker Álvaro Negredo, who registered 18.

Valencia

Mata had a release clause at Real Madrid during his last season at the club, and eventually agreed to sign for fellow La Liga side Valencia CF in March 2007, with the contract starting on 30 June 2007.

Benefitting from constant injuries to Vicente and the ostracism to which then-manager Ronald Koeman condemned Miguel Ángel Angulo, Mata gradually carved a niche in Valencia's first eleven. On 20 March 2008, he scored twice in the Copa del Rey semi-final match against FC Barcelona to help Valencia reach the final against Getafe CF where, on 16 April, he scored the opener in a 3–1 win. During that first season, he was voted the team's Best Young Player by fans and players alike.

In the 2008 Spanish SuperCup, Mata scored against his former club Real Madrid in a 3–2 first leg win, but Valencia lost 5–6 on aggregate after a 2–4 away loss in the second game. He started 2008–09 well, scoring in the opener against RCD Mallorca in a 3–0 win. He also scored the only goal of the game against CA Osasuna, latching on to a long ball from David Villa.

On 25 September 2008, Mata proved to be growing in efficiency, as he set up two of his teammate's goals in a 2–0 away win over Málaga CF. Three days later, he put in a superb performance against Deportivo de La Coruña, scoring one and creating the other three, in a 4–2 home victory.

Towards the end of the campaign, Mata managed to score two very important late goals for Valencia: the first, the 3–2 winner at Sporting de Gijón, and the second a penalty against Sevilla FC at home, to put Valencia 2–1 up (specialist Villa had already been replaced due to injury) in an eventual 3–1 success. He achieved impressive stats during the season, finishing with 11 successful strikes and 13 assists, behind just Barcelona's Xavi as the league's best.

In the following two seasons, Mata was an ever present offensive figure for Valencia, scoring 17 goals in 68 league games combined, with the club achieving back-to-back third-league places. On 10 April 2011, he scored two in a 5–0 home win against Valencian neighbours Villarreal CF. On 9 May, England-based Spanish journalist Guillem Balagué reported interest from several Premier League clubs.

Chelsea

Transfer
On 21 August 2011, Valencia announced they had agreed a £23.5 million fee for the transfer of Mata to Premier League club Chelsea, subject to a medical. On 24 August 2011, Mata signed a five-year deal with Chelsea. He revealed that compatriot Fernando Torres helped persuade him to move to Stamford Bridge, saying "Fernando got me excited about the thought of coming here. He said it would be good for me here, and that me and him together could be good. I also talked to my family and friends about it as well."

On 26 August 2011, Yossi Benayoun offered Mata his number 10 shirt. The Israeli captain said, "I decided to give Mata the number 10 – his favourite. For me, it's just a number, not my lucky 15." (Florent Malouda wore number 15 for Chelsea at the time.) Mata wore number 10 for Valencia and for Spain's under-21s in the summer, and expressed his gratitude to Benayoun. "It is a very important number to me so I'm pleased to be wearing it. I want to thank Yossi," he said. Mata followed on from Chelsea players Joe Cole, Mark Hughes, Ian Hutchinson, and Terry Venables in adopting the number 10 shirt.

2011–13: European success

Mata made his debut for Chelsea against Norwich City on 27 August 2011, where he came on as a 68th-minute substitute for Florent Malouda and scored the club's third goal in the 11th minute of stoppage time. Chelsea went on to win the match 3–1. He started his first game for his new club in their next fixture on 10 September away to Sunderland, helping Chelsea secure a 1–2 win. On 14 September, Mata made his UEFA Champions League debut for Chelsea and scored in stoppage time to help his side defeat Bayer Leverkusen 2–0.

On 29 October 2011, Mata assisted Chelsea's 6,000th league goal with an in-swinging cross which was headed in by Frank Lampard. In the same game, Mata scored with a spectacular 25-yard strike in a 3–5 home defeat to London rivals Arsenal. On 26 November, Mata set up the first two goals which were scored by John Terry and Daniel Sturridge and also scored the third goal himself in a 3–0 win against Wolverhampton Wanderers. He was awarded the Man of the Match in a 0–3 away win at St James' Park for his performance against Newcastle United.

On 6 December 2011, during Chelsea's decisive Champions League match against former club Valencia CF, Mata created two assists for both of Didier Drogba goals. The game ended in a 3–0 win, which resulted in Chelsea qualifying first from their group. On Boxing Day, Mata scored his side's only goal in a 1–1 draw at Stamford Bridge against Fulham. Mata scored Chelsea's first goal of their FA Cup campaign in a 4–0 win over Portsmouth at Stamford Bridge.

In an FA Cup fourth round tie with Queens Park Rangers at Loftus Road, Mata scored his side's only goal from the penalty spot in a 0–1 victory. On 5 February 2012, Mata scored against Manchester United in a 3–3 draw. On 21 February, Mata scored his side's only goal in their 1–3 defeat away at Napoli in the first leg of the Champions League round of 16.

After the appointment of Roberto Di Matteo as interim first-team coach, Mata was played as a central attacking midfielder rather than being played on the left wing. Mata scored and had a penalty saved by Colin Doyle in the FA Cup fifth round replay against Birmingham City at St Andrew's, which Chelsea won 2–0, helping them into the quarter-finals of the FA Cup. He continued his trait of scoring in each round; this run, however, ended against Leicester City in the quarter-final, which Chelsea nonetheless won 5–2. On 7 April, Mata scored his 11th goal of the season against Wigan Athletic, giving the Blues a 2–1 victory over the Latics and kept alive Chelsea's fight for a Champions League spot.

On 15 April, in Chelsea's 5–1 win against Tottenham Hotspur in the FA Cup semi-final at Wembley Stadium, Mata scored a controversial goal and assisted Ramires and Florent Malouda for their goals, adding to his statistics in the 2011–12 FA Cup with four goals and three assists. Mata started in both legs of Chelsea's Champions League semi-final clash with reigning champions FC Barcelona, helping his side to an unexpected 3–2 win on aggregate. and set up a final clash with Bayern Munich on 19 May.

Mata provided two assists to fellow Spaniard Fernando Torres in the 6–1 thrashing of West London rivals Queens Park Rangers on 29 April, bringing his tally to 13 Premier League assists on the season. Mata assisted the first goal in the FA Cup final, which Ramires scored, as Chelsea beat Liverpool 2–1 at Wembley, with Mata picking up the Man of the Match award. On 10 May, Mata was rewarded for his consistent form throughout his first Chelsea season by the fans voting him the club's Player of the Year, following on from Chelsea legends such as Dennis Wise and Gianfranco Zola, whom he had been compared to on various occasions.

In the 2012 UEFA Champions League final against Bayern Munich on 19 May, Mata assisted Didier Drogba's headed equaliser from a corner kick in the 88th minute. The match went on to extra time and penalties, with Mata taking Chelsea's first, which Bayern goalkeeper Manuel Neuer saved. Chelsea, however, went on to win 4–3 in the penalty-shootout, lifting their first Champions League title. Mata finished his first season at Stamford Bridge with 573 passes, creating 66 chances and completing 61 successful crosses, which all contributed to Chelsea's cup-double winning season. He finished the Premier League season with 14 assists – second highest in the league after Manchester City's David Silva – and six goals.

Mata missed all of Chelsea's pre-season games as he was playing for Spain at the 2012 Summer Olympics in London, but he returned to play in the 2012 FA Community Shield against Manchester City and was substituted after 74 minutes for Daniel Sturridge. Mata assisted his first goal of the season on 22 September 2012 against Stoke City, providing a great flick to Ashley Cole, which turned out to be the winning goal as Chelsea won 1–0. He scored his first goal of the season in the 2012–13 Football League Cup third round against Wolverhampton Wanderers, with the game finishing 6–0 to Chelsea. Four days later, he scored his first Premier League goal of the season, assisting Fernando Torres for the opener and then scoring directly from a free-kick in a 2–1 away win against Arsenal at the Emirates Stadium.

Mata scored Chelsea's first and third goal in the Champions League as Chelsea beat Nordsjælland 0–4 away in Farum, Denmark. He later provided two assists in Chelsea's 4–1 rout of Norwich City, sending Eden Hazard through on goal and later flicking a delightful ball for defender Branislav Ivanović to volley in. In a London Derby game against Tottenham Hotspur at White Hart Lane on 20 October, Mata scored twice and provided an assist for Daniel Sturridge in a 2–4 victory for Chelsea, where he also earned Man of the Match honours. He next scored in a Premier League match with a beautiful free kick against Manchester United. Chelsea, however, lost the match 3–2 after a late controversial goal from Javier Hernández. Mata went on to win the Premier League Player of the Month award for October after scoring three league goals.

After manager Roberto Di Matteo was sacked following a 3–0 defeat to Juventus in the Champions League, Mata scored the first goal of new, interim manager Rafael Benítez's reign at Chelsea against West Ham United, although Chelsea suffered a 3–1 defeat in this game. He scored again in Chelsea's win over Nordsjælland in a Champions League game, but Chelsea still failed to advance to the knockouts despite a 6–1 win at home. He added to his tally of goals and his collection of fine performance at Sunderland in a 1–3 Chelsea win. After this game, Chelsea traveled to Japan for the 2012 FIFA Club World Cup. Here, too, Mata continued his top form by scoring Chelsea's first goal in the tournament against Monterrey in the semi-final, helping them on their course to the final with a 1–3 victory. The tournament, however, ended in disappointment as Chelsea were beaten 1–0 by Brazilian club Corinthians in the final. The team put the defeat behind them by completing an 8–0 routing of Aston Villa, a game in which though Mata did not score a goal, but nevertheless played a very influential part.

On 22 December 2012, Mata signed a contract extension with Chelsea which tied him up with the club until 2018. On Boxing Day, Chelsea traveled to Carrow Road to face Norwich City, where both Manchester United and Arsenal had suffered defeats earlier in the season. Mata scored a brilliant goal in the 38th minute, taking a pass from Oscar into his stride and launching an unstoppable shot into the goal from 25 yards out. The goal turned out to be the winner. Then, on 5 January, Mata provided assists for new acquisition Demba Ba and Branislav Ivanović to help Chelsea win 1–5 against Southampton in the third round of the 2012–13 FA Cup. A week later, he forced an own goal from Jonathan Walters by putting in a tight corner and earned a penalty which Frank Lampard converted. Chelsea went on to win the game 0–4, which was Stoke's first home defeat of the season.
Mata scored his eighth goal of the season in the Premier League against Arsenal in a 2–1 home win.

On 3 March 2013, Mata made his 100th appearance in all competitions for Chelsea in a 1–0 win over West Bromwich Albion at Stamford Bridge. On 14 March, Mata scored an opening goal in Chelsea's Europa League 3–1 (3–2) win against Steaua București. On 19 April, Mata was nominated for PFA Players' Player of the Year in recognition of his contribution to Chelsea's season in all competitions. The PFA's decision was based on his "ability to not only create goals but also score them himself" and saw him nominated alongside teammate Eden Hazard. He also scored an 87th-minute winner against Manchester United, a crucial one for Chelsea's Champions League qualification hopes.

On 15 May, Mata gave a fine performance in the 2013 UEFA Europa League Final against Portugal's Benfica, assisting Branislav Ivanović's injury time winner from a corner kick. The next day, he was awarded Chelsea's Player's Player of the Year award. He modestly gave the credit to the whole of the squad, saying that, "he felt proud to play for Chelsea," and thanked his teammates. He was also awarded Chelsea's Player of the Year for the second successive season. On winning his second award of the night, he said, "I feel so happy. It's my second season here and winning the trophy two years in a row is amazing for me. I just want to say thank you to all the supporters and all my teammates."

2013–14: Mid-season departure
Under new Chelsea manager José Mourinho, Mata spent a lot of time on the bench. Mourinho preferred Oscar as a playmaker, and suggested Mata needed to adapt to a wider position and to working harder defensively. On 28 September 2013, Mata came on as a half-time substitute against Tottenham Hotspur to assist John Terry to score an equaliser in a 1–1 draw, but his appearances in the first team remained infrequent. On 29 October, he scored his first goal of the season in a 2–0 League Cup victory at London rivals Arsenal.

Mata struggled to secure a regular first-team place under Mourinho as he had started just 11 of Chelsea's 22 Premier League matches. Mata scored 33 goals and provided 58 assists in 135 appearances over two-and-a-half seasons with Chelsea.

Manchester United

Transfer
On 24 January 2014, Mourinho said Chelsea had accepted a transfer offer from Manchester United and he allowed Mata to travel to Manchester to undergo a medical, after the player said he was "really happy to go". Manchester United confirmed later in the day that a transfer fee had been agreed, but that the deal was still contingent on Mata agreeing personal terms and passing a medical. The transfer was completed the following day, with Manchester United paying Chelsea a then club record fee of £37.1 million (€46 million), with Mata signing a contract until the summer of 2018.

2014–15: Debut season and individual success
 

He made his debut against Cardiff City on 28 January and provided one assist in the 2–0 home victory. Mata scored his first goal for United in a 4–1 win over Aston Villa on 29 March 2014. He also went on to score two goals against Newcastle United in a 4–0 away victory, two more against Norwich City after coming off the bench in another 4–0 win, and the only goal in a 1–1 draw against Southampton in the final match of the season.

Mata ended the season having scored six goals for Manchester United, all in the Premier League, since he was cup tied and unable to play in the Champions League and other cup competitions due to his participation in the tournaments with Chelsea earlier in the season.

Mata began the new season in fine form. He scored the only goal in Manchester United's second game of the Premier League season, a 1–1 draw against Sunderland at Stadium of Light, following it up with a goal against Queens Park Rangers in a 4–0 thumping, which was also Louis van Gaal's first competitive win in charge of United. He was later dropped to the bench for the following two matches, making cameo appearances against Leicester and West Ham, with van Gaal preferring an attacking trinity of Wayne Rooney, Robin van Persie and new signing Radamel Falcao in both games.

Following Rooney's sending off and suspension due to a foul on Stewart Downing in the match against West Ham, Mata was reinstated to the starting lineup, and he started the next match against Everton, a 2–1 win at Old Trafford in which he provided the assist for Ángel Di María's goal. Mata later scored winning goals in home games against Crystal Palace and Stoke City, the former after coming on as a second-half substitute. He made his return to the starting line-ups for the first time, in a 3–0 win over Tottenham but was substituted in the 77th minute for Andreas Pereira. On 22 March 2015, Mata scored a brace, including a bicycle kick, in a 2–1 victory over Liverpool, a performance which he rated as his best for Manchester United. His second goal against Liverpool was also voted as Premier League Goal of the Month in March 2015. His inspired performances led to him being named as Manchester United's Player of the Month for March.

2015–16: FA Cup win
 
Mata, just as he had in the previous campaign, had a fine start to the season, getting an assist in the second game of the campaign against Aston Villa, which helped maintain his side's impressive record at Villa Park. September was a month to remember for Mata as he scored two goals and made two assists in just three games, as Manchester United claimed wins against Liverpool, Southampton, and Sunderland. As a result, Mata was crowned the club's Player of The Month.

Mata was made captain for the home game against Watford on 2 March and scored a free kick, which was also the match-winner. On 6 March, in a 1–0 defeat to West Brom, Mata received his first career red card after obtaining two yellow cards in the space of three minutes. Mata assisted an Anthony Martial goal against West Ham in the final game at the Boleyn Ground; however, United lost 3–2, ending their chances of beating Manchester City for fourth-place.

On 21 May 2016, Mata scored for United in the FA Cup Final against Crystal Palace, leveling the score at 1–1 just three minutes after Jason Puncheon's 78th-minute goal. Mata was substituted in the 90th minute and replaced by Jesse Lingard, who would score the winning goal for United in extra time.

2016–17: UEFA Europa League, League Cup wins

At the beginning of the summer, Mata was reunited with his former Chelsea manager and the person who sold him to Manchester United, José Mourinho. On 7 August 2016, Mata was selected to be on the bench in the FA Community Shield. Mata replaced Jesse Lingard in the second half, then was substituted in added time for Henrikh Mkhitaryan. Although there were reports about tensions between the player and manager, after the match, Mata stated that there were no tensions between him and Mourinho. He started in the opening match of the season against AFC Bournemouth and scored Manchester United's first Premier League goal of the season with a tap-in after Simon Francis' error. After José Mourinho dropped captain Wayne Rooney, Mata served as the stand-in captain in the 0–0 draw against Burnley on 29 October 2016.

2017–20: Later years and contract extension
Mata scored his third brace of his Manchester United career, scoring both goals in a Boxing Day fixture against Leicester City. However, his efforts were cancelled out by a late equaliser from Harry Maguire which saw the match finish 2–2. Mata finished the season with three goals in 40 appearances for the Red Devils, as United finished second in the Premier League and lost in the 2018 FA Cup Final against his former club, Chelsea.

Mata scored United's first goal of the season in a friendly against Club América on 19 July 2018. Mata's first competitive goal came in the 3rd minute of United's League Cup exit to Derby County on 25 September 2018. On 6 October, Mata scored United's first goal in a 3-2 comeback win over Newcastle United. Later, on 7 November 2018, Mata scored the equaliser from a free kick in another late comeback 2–1 win over Juventus in a Champions League group stage fixture. Mata also scored in a 4–1 win over Fulham on 8 December 2018, before scoring his final goal of the season in a 1–1 draw against his former club Chelsea on 28 April 2019.

On 19 June 2019, it was confirmed that Mata had signed a new two-year contract with Manchester United, keeping him at the club until June 2021 with the option of a further year. This ended months of speculation over his future.

Mata's first goal of the 2019–20 season came from the spot in 4–0 win over AZ in United's final Europa League group stage game. Mata later scored the only goal in January in an FA Cup third round replay against Wolverhampton Wanderers. Mata then scored in United's final game before the temporary suspension of football due to the COVID-19 pandemic in a 5–0 victory over LASK.

2020–21 season
After scoring against Luton and Brighton in the third and fourth round of the League Cup respectively, Mata received praise for his performance in a comeback 4–1 win against Newcastle United in the Premier League on 17 October 2020. Whilst not scoring he provided an assist for Maguire's equaliser as well as being involved in the build up for all other goals. Manager Ole Gunnar Solskjær described his game as "fantastic" while Sky Sports said United's win was "largely thanks to [Solskjær's] decision to turn to Mata". On 23 May 2021, he scored his only Premier League goal of the season in a 2–1 away win over Wolverhampton Wanderers.

2021–22 season 
On 2 July 2021, Mata signed a contract extension with Manchester United, keeping him at the club for another year. After having made twelve appearances throughout the whole 2021-2022 campaign, the last of which during the team's last league fixture against Crystal Palace (on 22 May 2022), Mata left the club at the end of the season following his contract expiration. The Spaniard's time at Old Trafford came to an end after eight years, a total amount of 285 appearances and 51 goals and four trophies won with the club.

Galatasaray
On 8 September 2022, he signed a one-year contract with Turkish Süper Lig team Galatasaray, with the option to extend the deal by a further year. He made his debut for the Turkish side on 24 September 2022, in a friendly match against Istanbulspor and showed an impressive performance.

He scored his first Süper Lig goal on 28 October 2022 after coming on as a second-half substitute against Fatih Karagümrük.

International career

Mata represented Spain from 2004 to 2016 at under-16, under-17, under-19, under-20, under-21, Olympic and senior levels.

He helped Spain win the 2006 UEFA European Under-19 Football Championship, where he was a key player. He finished the championship second to his teammate Alberto Bueno (five goals) as top goal scorer of the competition, with four in five matches.

On 1 February 2007, under-21 coach Iñaki Sáez included him on his squad for the friendly against England, alongside Real Madrid teammates Roberto Soldado, José Manuel Jurado, Sergio Sánchez, Miguel Torres, Esteban Granero and Antonio Adán, at just 18 years and 10 months.

On 14 November 2008, Vicente del Bosque called Mata up to the senior team to play in a friendly against Chile. He did not leave the bench in a 3–0 home win. On 28 March 2009, he finally made his debut, playing in the 2010 FIFA World Cup qualifier against Turkey, a 1–0 win in Madrid. He came on as a substitute for teammate David Villa in the 63rd minute.

In June 2009, Del Bosque included Mata for the 2009 FIFA Confederations Cup, the youngster's first senior tournament. He started in the second group match against Iraq and came on as a substitute for Albert Riera in the semi-final loss to the United States.

On 9 September 2009, Mata scored his first goal for the senior team, as the 3–0 win against Estonia secured a place in the World Cup in South Africa. He followed this up with the winner against Armenia on 10 October, scoring a penalty to steal a 2–1 win. Picked for the final stages, he appeared once for the eventual champions, replacing Fernando Torres for the final 20 minutes of the 2–0 group stage win against Honduras.

In 2011, the following summer, he returned to the under-21 side as a senior squad member and helped Spain win the 2011 UEFA European Under-21 Championship in Denmark. Mata himself was included in UEFA's Team of the Tournament and named as the tournament's Golden Player.

Mata returned to the senior squad for UEFA Euro 2012 and, after coming on as a substitute, scored Spain's fourth goal in the final as Spain defeated Italy 4–0 to retain their title as champions of Europe.

Mata was included in Spain's squad for the 2012 Olympic football tournament as one of their three designated overage players. Spain, however, failed to score in any of their opening three matches and were eliminated at the group stage.

Style of play

In addition to his favoured playmaking role through the centre of the pitch behind the forwards, Mata is also comfortable playing on either wing; he has also been used as a second striker on occasion. He makes up for a lack of pace with his control, technique, passing, creativity, and vision, which allows him to link-up with teammates and register many assists, in addition to scoring goals. Predominantly left footed, he is also a well-known free kick specialist. However, he has drawn criticism at times in the media over his limited defensive skills and work-rate.

Business interests
In November 2012, along with fellow Premier League players Santi Cazorla and Michu, Mata bought shares in former club Real Oviedo, who were struggling to raise €2 million to stay afloat in the Spanish third division.

Mata and his father Juan Manuel Mata were part-owners of Tapeo and Wine, a Spanish restaurant on Deansgate in Manchester city centre, which opened in 2016 and closed in 2020 as a result of COVID-19. Mata and his father felt that authentic Spanish food options in Manchester were insufficient and so wanted to create their own restaurant. At the time, both Manchester managers, Pep Guardiola and José Mourinho were regular patrons.

In August 2017, Mata announced in an article for The Players' Tribune that he was pledging one percent of his salary to a pledge-based charitable movement named Common Goal, and called for other football players to do the same.

Career statistics

Club

International

As of match played 15 November 2016. Spain score listed first, score column indicates score after each Mata goal.

Honours

Valencia
Copa del Rey: 2007–08

Chelsea
FA Cup: 2011–12
UEFA Champions League: 2011–12
UEFA Europa League: 2012–13
FIFA Club World Cup runner-up: 2012

Manchester United
FA Cup: 2015–16
EFL Cup: 2016–17
FA Community Shield: 2016
UEFA Europa League: 2016–17; runner-up: 2020–21

Spain U19
UEFA European Under-19 Championship: 2006

Spain U21
UEFA European Under-21 Championship: 2011

Spain
FIFA World Cup: 2010
UEFA European Championship: 2012
FIFA Confederations Cup runner-up: 2013; third place: 2009

Individual
UEFA European Under-21 Championship Golden Player: 2011
UEFA European Under-21 Championship Team of the Tournament: 2011
Chelsea Player of the Year: 2011–12, 2012–13
Chelsea Players' Player of the Year: 2012–13
Premier League Player of the Month: October 2012
PFA Team of the Year: 2012–13 Premier League

References

External links

 
 
 
 

1988 births
Living people
Sportspeople from Burgos
Footballers from Oviedo
Spanish footballers
Footballers from Castile and León
Association football wingers
Association football forwards
Real Madrid Castilla footballers
Valencia CF players
Chelsea F.C. players
Manchester United F.C. players
Galatasaray S.K. footballers
Segunda División players
La Liga players
Premier League players
Süper Lig players
UEFA Champions League winning players
UEFA Europa League winning players
Spain youth international footballers
Spain under-21 international footballers
Spain under-23 international footballers
Olympic footballers of Spain
Spain international footballers
2009 FIFA Confederations Cup players
2010 FIFA World Cup players
UEFA Euro 2012 players
Footballers at the 2012 Summer Olympics
2013 FIFA Confederations Cup players
2014 FIFA World Cup players
FIFA World Cup-winning players
UEFA European Championship-winning players
Spanish expatriate footballers
Spanish expatriate sportspeople in England
Spanish expatriate sportspeople in Turkey
Expatriate footballers in England
FA Cup Final players